Vijayawada Central (Assembly constituency) or (Ajith Singh Nagar) is a constituency in NTR district of Andhra Pradesh, representing the state legislative assembly in India. It is one of the seven assembly segments of Vijayawada Lok Sabha constituency, along with Tiruvuru (SC), Vijayawada East, Vijayawada West, Mylavaram, Nandigama, and Jaggayyapeta.

Malladi Vishnu  is the present MLA of the constituency, who won the 2019 Andhra Pradesh Legislative Assembly election from YSR Congress Party. , there are a total of 269,859 electors in the constituency.

Mandals 

The mandal and wards that form the assembly constituency are:

Members of Legislative Assembly

Election Results

Assembly elections 2019

Assembly elections 2014

Assembly Elections 2009

See also 
 List of constituencies of the Andhra Pradesh Legislative Assembly
 Vijayawada East (Assembly constituency)
 Vijayawada West (Assembly constituency)

References 

Assembly constituencies of Andhra Pradesh